The border of the European Union consists of the land and sea borders that member states of the EU share with foreign states adjacent to the union.

Border status and cooperation
In 2004 the European Union developed the European Neighbourhood Policy (ENP) for the promotion of cooperation between the EU and its neighbours to the east and south of the European territory of the EU (i.e., excluding its outermost regions outside of Europe), which, in part, includes the Cross-Border Cooperation programme aimed at the promotion of economic development in border areas and ensuring border security.

External border control 
The Border and Coast Guard Agency, more commonly known as Frontex, was established in 2004. Its main task is external border control of the Schengen Area. Most of its activities are coordinated with the coast and border guards of member states.

List of bilateral land borders

Current borders

De facto borders
Cyprus–Northern Cyprus border (Green Line)

Former borders

See also
Schengen Area
Frontex

References

External links
Grigore Silaşi, Ovidiu Laurian Simina (eds.), Migration, Mobility and Human Rights at the Eastern Border of the European Union: Space of Freedom and Security, 2008,  Editura Universităţii de Vest,